Medvezhy Island (Medvezhy Ostrov) is a long, narrow island in the northwestern Sea of Okhotsk, the westernmost of the Shantar Islands. It lies on the eastern side of Uda Gulf. It is 12.9 km (8 mi) long. It is separated from the mainland by Shevchenko Straight.

History

Between 1855 and 1874, American whaleships anchored under Medvezhy to obtain shelter from storms and retrieve wood. They also used it as a staging point to send out smaller whaleboats to capture bowhead whales in Uda and Tugur Bays. They called it Elbow Island. 

On the night of 11 October 1858, the bark Phoenix (323 tons), of Nantucket, under Captain Bethuel Handy, of Cotuit, was wrecked on the west side of the island during a gale. Captain Handy and about a dozen men later crossed the frozen Shevchenko Strait and traveled along the coast to Chumikan at the mouth of the Uda River where native hunters took them inland to the Russian military settlement of Udskoye, where they spent the winter; while the first mate Charles Chester and the rest of the crew spent the winter in a hut of wood and sails they had built on Medvezhy. In June 1859, the men at Udskoye traveled to the mouth of the Uda River, where they were rescued by the ship Java; the rest of the crew on Medvezhy were saved by other ships.

References

Shantar Islands
Shipwrecks in the Sea of Okhotsk